Rudolf Christian of  Ostfriesland, Count of East Frisia, was count of East Frisia, (Hage, 2 June 1602 – Hage, 17 April 1628) and the second son of Enno III, Count of East Frisia and Anna of Holstein-Gottorp. During his reign, foreign troops participating in the Thirty Years' War began retreating into and quartering in East Frisia. Also during his reign, fen exploitation in East Frisia begins.

He reached a settlement with the East Frisian Estates, who them paid him homage, ultimately even the city of Emden did so.  Under his leadership, the Harlingerland was finally incorporated in the county of East Frisia.  This is visible in the county's coat of arms, which was introduced under his rule in 1625 and remained in use until the county was annexed by Prussia in 1744.

At the age of just 26, he got embroiled in a fight with a lieutenant of the army of general Matthias Gallas, which was quartered in Berum Castle.  He was stabbed in the left eye, and died of his wound.

Since Rudolf Christian was childless, he was succeeded as Count of East Frisia by his brother Ulrich II.

Ancestors

References and sources 
 Tielke, Martin (ed.): Biographisches Lexikon für Ostfriesland, Ostfriesisches Landschaftliche Verlag- u. Vertriebsgeschäft, Aurich, vol. 1  (1993), vol. 2  (1997), vol. 3  (2001)
 Heinrich Reimers: Ostfriesland bis zum Aussterben seines Fürstenhauses, Bremen, 1925
 Ernst Esselborn: Das Geschlecht Cirksena, Berlin, 1945

East Frisia, Rudolf Christian of
East Frisia, Rudolf Christian of
Counts of East Frisia
17th-century German people